New World is the first solo album from Lauri Ylönen, lead singer of Finnish band The Rasmus. The album was released on 30 March 2011. This album contains songs by Lauri that didn't fit The Rasmus' style, and decided to be released as a solo album.  The first single released was "Heavy" and the second was "In the City".

Charts

Track listing

All the songs were written by Lauri Ylönen, except for tracks 2 to 7 which were written by Lauri Ylönen and Pauli Rantasalmi.

References

2011 debut albums